Gabriele Smargiassi (1798 – May 12, 1882) was an Italian painter and leader of the Neapolitan Academy of Fine Arts in Naples, Italy.

Biography
Smargiassi was born in Vasto, Chieti. Initially aiming to be a priest like his uncle, an artistic talent was recognized, and he was sent at age 19 to train in Naples. briefly with Giuseppe Cammarano, and then for seven years with Anton Sminck van Pitloo. He then traveled to Rome, where he was briefly tutor to Louis-Philippe, future king of France. He was patronized in Paris by the Salon of the Duchess of Saint-Leu. When Pitloo died in 1837, Smargiassi returned to Naples to fill the chair of Professor of Landscape painting for the Academy of Arts in Naples. The other candidate for the position was Salvatore Fergola. In Naples, he was patronized by the Count of Aquila. Giacinto Gigante was a contemporary and fellow-painter, while  Francesco Mancini, Alfonso Simonetti, and Raimondo Scoppa were among his pupils.

He specialized in paintings including rural landscapes.  He died in Naples.

Bibliografia

1798 births
1882 deaths
People from Vasto
18th-century Italian painters
Italian male painters
19th-century Italian painters
Painters from Naples
Academic staff of the Accademia di Belle Arti di Napoli
19th-century Italian male artists
18th-century Italian male artists